La Bottega dell'Arte (also spelled just as Bottega dell'Arte) were an Italian pop music group active between 1974 and 1985.

Career 
The group formed in 1974 in Rome. Between 1976 and 1977 they had three singles charting between the fifth and the seventh place on the Italian hit parade. In 1980 the group entered the main competition at the Sanremo Music Festival with the song "Più di una canzone". The group disbanded in 1985, with the members pursuing solo careers as producers, composers and musicians.

Members 
  (1958-2016) - keyboards, vocals
 Massimo Calabrese (1955-) - bass guitar, guitar, vocals
 Romano Musumarra (1956-) - keyboards, flute, guitars and vocals
 Fernando Ciucci (1952-2011) - guitars and vocals
 Alberto Bartoli (1955-) - drums

Discography 
Albums
     1975: La Bottega dell'Arte (EMI Italiana, 3C-064-18106)
     1977: Dentro (EMI Italiana, 3C-064-18248)
     1979: L'avventura (EMI Italiana, 3C064-18423)
     1980: La Bottega dell'Arte (EMI Italiana, 3C-064-18493)
     1984: Forza 4 (New Sound, NWLP 1701)

References

External links
 
 

Musical groups established in 1974
Italian pop music groups
1974 establishments in Italy
Musical groups disestablished in 1985